Iftikhar-ul-Ḥasan ibn Rauf-ul-Ḥasan Kāndhlawī  (10 January 1922 – 2 June 2019) was an Indian Islamic scholar and preacher. He laid the foundation of Idgah of Kandhla in the year 1946. He wrote more than forty books.

Literary works
Kandhlawi's books include:. 
 Aakhirat ki Yaad
 Aamal e Ramazan
 Aashor e Muharramul Haram
 Akser Zikrillah
 Dua Ki Ahmiat
 Fazilat e Quran
 Haq Taala ke Do Makhsos Inam
 Ilm Kaise Hasil Kiya Jata Hai
 Islam Me Amanatdari
 Islam aur Musalmano ke Gair ke Sath
 Isteghfar ki Haqiqat
 Namaz ki Ahmiyat
 Tafsir-e-Muawwazatin
 Tauon Azab-e-Elahi
 Ulama-e- Islam ka Muttfiqa Faisla

Death
Kandhlawi died on 2 June 2019, coinciding with the Islamic date of 27 Ramadan 1440 AH, in Kandhla, at the age of 97. All the markets in the city remained closed for mourning the death of the preacher. According to news reports, lakhs of people from Shamli and adjoining districts joined the funeral procession. Muslims as well as people following other religions joined the procession. The local police chief and politicians also attended the funeral. Special arrangements for the managing the traffic and the huge crowd in the processions were made by the local administration.

References

External links
Funeral procession of Iftikhar-ul-Hasan Kandhlawi
 https://www.patrika.com/muzaffarnagar-news/cheat-with-aap-leader-on-the-name-of-the-islamic-guru-hazrat-maulana-iftikhar-ul-hasan-1621793/

1922 births
2019 deaths
20th-century Muslim scholars of Islam
Indian religious leaders
Indian Sunni Muslim scholars of Islam
Hanafis
20th-century Indian philosophers
Urdu-language writers
Tablighi Jamaat people
People from Muzaffarnagar district
People from Shamli district